Ryazan Museum of Long-Range Aviation is a Russian thematic museum and exhibition complex located on the territory of the 43rd Air Force Flight Training and Retraining Center at Dyagilevo air base, Ryazan. Exposition of the complex combines a large number of objects related to the history of the development and use of military aviation in the USSR and the Russian Federation. It includes domestic combat aircraft, samples of their weapons and equipment, military uniforms, equipment, personal belongings and awards to outstanding pilots. It also includes documents, maps, photographs, etc. Over the years the museum has conducted more than 6,000 tours, and the number of visitors has exceeded 120,000 people.

History 
The museum was created on the initiative of Lieutenant Colonel Yuli Nikolayevich Yermakov, an instructor of the 43rd Military Training Center. This initiative was approved by Colonel-General Vasily Reshetnikov, the Commander of Long-Range Aviation of the Soviet Union, and by Lieutenant-General N. F. Malinovsky, head of the Long-Range Aviation's Political Department. The opening of the museum complex took place on April 29, 1975.

In accordance with the Directive of the Minister of Defence of the Russian Federation dated June 4, 2009, D-024, in the course of optimization of the organizational structure of military units, the Long-Range Aviation Museum was no longer part of the 43rd Combat Training Center, and its employees were dismissed. Nevertheless, the Long-Range Aviation Museum has continued to operate on a voluntary basis.

Gallery

See also 
 Poltava Museum of Long-Range and Strategic Aviation
 Poltava-4
 Ukrainian Long Range Aviation
 Operation Frantic
 Ukraine State Aviation Museum
 Aviation Technical Museum (Lugansk)
 Military History Museum of the Air Forces of the Armed Forces of Ukraine

References

External links 

Aerospace museums in Russia
Military and war museums in Russia
Open-air museums in Russia
Museums established in 1975
Ryazan
Air force museums
Russian military aviation
Russian Air Force
Soviet Air Force
Cold War museums
Museums in Ryazan Oblast